Jürgen Bertow (born 21 April 1950) is a retired German rower. He won a bronze medal at the 1976 Summer Olympics and a silver at the 1975 World Championships in the double sculls, as well as a world title in the quad sculls in 1974. For these achievements he received the Patriotic Order of Merit in 1974 and 1976.

References

1950 births
Living people
East German male rowers
Olympic medalists in rowing
World Rowing Championships medalists for East Germany
Medalists at the 1976 Summer Olympics
Olympic bronze medalists for East Germany
Olympic rowers of East Germany
Rowers at the 1976 Summer Olympics